Renaud et Armide is a three acts tragedy written by French dramatist Jean Cocteau, premiered on 13 April 1943 at the Comédie-Française.

A TV version of the play was made in 1969, directed by Marcel Cravenne.

Cast
 Marie Bell: Armide
 Mary Marquet: Oriane
 Maurice Escande: Renaud
 Jacques Dacqmine: Olivier
 Theatre director: Jean Cocteau
 Scenic design: Christian Bérard

Plays by Jean Cocteau